Milind Gunaji (born 23 July 1961) is an Indian actor, model, television presenter, writer and author, most known for his roles in Marathi and Hindi cinema. He made his first film appearance in 1993's Papeeha and has since performed in over 250 films and acted as the host of the Zee Marathi channel travel show Bhatkanti. Gunaji has served as the Government of Maharashtra's brand ambassador for forest and wildlife. Currently he is the brand ambassador for Hill Station Mahabaleshwar.

Career
Gunaji was born on 23 July 1961 in Bombay (present-day Mumbai), Maharashtra. Gunaji initially began acting in the 1993 film Papeeha and first gained widespread notice in the 1996's Fareb in the role of Inspector Indrajeet Saxena. The role gained him a Filmfare Award nomination for Best Performance in a Negative Role.

In 2009 he was named the brand ambassador for the Novel Institute Group's NIBR College of Hotel Management. Milind did Everest , which aired on  Star Plus November 2014. He has also made a brief appearance in South Indian cinema playing important roles in two movies Aalavandhan (Tamil) and  Krishnam Vande Jagadgurum (Telugu).

Gunaji has held many solo photo exhibitions as a photographer in Balgandharva Pune, Kalidas Hall in Nashik, Prabodhankar Thackeray Hall in Vile Parle among others.

He has served as a travel writer, brand ambassador of Intiamatkat Tours and writing a weekly column in the Lokprabha supplement of Marathi daily Loksatta. As an author, Gunaji has penned 12 books. In 1998 he published his first book, Majhi Mulukhgiri, a compilation of his Lokprabha columns. Gunaji has modeled, stating that it "satisfies my ego and gives good monetary returns."

Filmography

TV serials
 1997: Byomkesh Bakshi (TV series) (Episode: Sahi Ka Kanta) as Debashish 
 2002: CID (Indian TV series)  (Episode 197,198/ the case of blackmail victim) - Johnny (Main culprit)
 2006–2009: Dharti Ka Veer Yodha Prithviraj Chauhan – Vijaypal
 2008-2010: Kulvadhu (Marathi Serial) - Ranvir Rajeshirke / Bhaiyyasaheb
 2011–2012: Veer Shivaji – Jagirdar Shahaji Raje Bhosale 
 2012–2013: Hum Ne Li Hai- Shapath – ACP Pratap Yashwantrao Teje
 3 November 2014 - 1 March 2015: Everest – Colonel Arun Abhyankar
 2013-2015: Khwabo Ke Darmiyan - Aastha's father
 Bhatkanti and Discover Maharashtra on Zee Marathi
 2022 Rudra: The Edge Of Darkness on Disney+ Hotstar

Works
 Majhi Mulukhagiri (1998)
 Bhatkanti (2001)
 Chala Mazya Govyala (2003)
 Offbeat Tracks in Maharashtra (2003)
 Chanderi Bhatkanti (2005)
 Gudha Ramya Maharashtra (2007)
 Mystical Magical Maharastra (2009)
 A Travel Guide Offbeat Tracks in Maharashtra (2009)
 Anwat (2011)
 Meri Avismarniya Yatra (2011)
 Gad Killyanchi Bhatkanti (2011)
 Hawai Mulukhgiri (2013)

Awards and nominations
1997: Nominated: Filmfare Best Villain Award for Fareb
1998: Nominated: Filmfare Best Villain Award for Virasat

References

External links

 
 

1961 births
Living people
20th-century Indian male actors
21st-century Indian male actors
Indian male film actors
Indian male television actors
Indian travel writers
Indian television presenters
Male actors from Pune
Male actors in Hindi cinema
Male actors in Marathi cinema
Marathi actors
Marathi-language writers
Writers from Pune